The men's featherweight event was part of the boxing programme at the 1988 Summer Olympics. The weight class allowed boxers of up to 57 kilograms to compete. The competition was held from 18 September to 2 October 1988. 48 boxers from 48 nations competed. Giovanni Parisi won the gold medal.

Medalists

Results
The following boxers took part in the event:

First round
 Wataru Yamada (JPN) def. Bakary Fofana (IVC), RSC-1
 Daniel Dumitrescu (ROU) def. Anthony Konyegwachie (NGA), 5:0
 Esteban Flores (PUR) def. Patrick Mwamba (ZAM), 4:1
 Wanchai Pongsri (THA) def. Ali Mohamed Jafer (YMD), RSC-1
 John Wanjau (KEN) def. László Szõke (HUN), 3:2
 Regilio Tuur (HOL) def. Kelcie Banks (USA), KO-1
 David Anderson (GBR) def. Domingo Damigella (ARG), 4:1
 Patrick Fitzgerald (IRL) def. Emilio Villegas (DOM), 4:1
 Ulaipalota Tautauma (SAM) def. Evance Malenga (MLW), 5:0
 Tomasz Nowak (POL) def. Djingarey Mamodou (NIG), 5:0
 Eugene Seymour (BAH) def. Orlando Dollente (PHI), 5:0
 Jarmo Eskelinen (FIN) def. Serigne Fall (GUI), 5:0
 Jamie Pagendam (CAN) def. Tserendorj Amarjargal (MGL), RSC-2
 Kirkor Kirkorov (BUL) def. Diego Drumm (GDR), 5:0
 Darren Hiles (AUS) def. Ali Celikiz (TUR), 5:0
 Lee Jae-Hyuk (KOR) def. Miguel Ángel González (MEX), 5:0

Second round
 Abdelhak Achik (MAR) def. Francisco Avelar (ELS), 4:1
 Omar Catari (VEN) def. Moussa Kagambega (BUF), KO-1
 Liu Dong (CHN) def. John Francis (IND), 3:2
 Serge Bouemba (GAB) def. Ilham Lahia (INA), 4:1
 Mikhail Kazaryan (URS) def. Ljubiša Simić (YUG), 5:0
 Giovanni Parisi (ITA) def. Lu Chih Hsiung (TPE), 5:0
 Ya'acov Shmuel (ISR) def. John Mirona (SUD), RSC-1
 Richard Pittman (CIS) def. Dumsane Mabuza (SWZ), 4:1
 Daniel Dumitrescu (ROU) def. Wataru Yamada (JPN), 5:0
 Wanchai Pongsri (THA) def. Esteban Flores (PUR), 5:0
 Regilio Tuur (HOL) def. John Wanjau (KEN), 4:1
 David Anderson (GBR) def. Patrick Fitzgerald (IRL), 5:0
 Tomasz Nowak (POL) def. Ulaipalota Tautauma (SAM), walk-over
 Eugene Seymour (BAH) def. Jarmo Eskelinen (FIN), walk-over
 Kirkor Kirkorov (BUL) def. Jamie Pagendam (CAN), walk-over
 Lee Jae-Hyuk (KOR) def. Darren Hiles (AUS), 3:2

Third round
 Abdelhak Achik (MAR) def. Omar Catari (VEN), KO-1
 Liu Dong (CHN) def. Serge Bouemba (GAB), 5:0
 Giovanni Parisi (ITA) def. Mikhail Kazaryan (URS), RSC-2
 Ya'acov Shmuel (ISR) def. Richard Pittman (CIS), 5:0
 Daniel Dumitrescu (ROU) def. Wanchai Pongsri (THA), 3:2
 Regilio Tuur (HOL) def. David Anderson (GBR), RSC-2
 Tomasz Nowak (POL) def. Eugene Seymour (BAH), 5:0
 Lee Jae-Hyuk (KOR) def. Kirkor Kirkorov (BUL), 5:0

Quarterfinals
 Abdelhak Achik (MAR) def. Liu Dong (CHN), KO-1
 Giovanni Parisi (ITA) def. Ya'acov Shmuel (ISR), 5:0
 Daniel Dumitrescu (ROU) def. Regilio Tuur (HOL), 5:0
 Lee Jae-Hyuk (KOR) def. Tomasz Nowak (POL), 5:0

Semifinals
 Giovanni Parisi (ITA) def. Abdelhak Achik (MAR), RSC-1
 Daniel Dumitrescu (ROU) def. Lee Jae-Hyuk (KOR), 5:0

Final
 Giovanni Parisi (ITA) def. Daniel Dumitrescu (ROU), KO-1

References

Featherweight